A list of rivers of the  Sundarbans  geographic region and ecoregion, located in Bangladesh and in West Bengal state of Eastern India.

The Bangladesh portion has 177 rivers flowing through it to the Bay of Bengal.

A
 Aar-Shibsa
 Agunjala
 Ambare
 Andharmanik River
 Angra Kana
 Arbase
 Arbhanga
 Arijakhali
 Ashashuni

Ba
 Badamtali
 Baganbari
 Bagaura
 Bahar Nadipar
 Baikiri
 Baikuntha Hana
 Bailo
 Baintala
 Bakir Khal
 Baksakhali
 Baluijhanki
 Bando
 Bangabali
 Bara Matla
 Bara Sheola
 Barabare
 Base
 Bayar Nala
 Bayla Koyla

Be–Bu
 Bekardon
 Beri-aada
 Betmuri
 Bharkunde
 Bhayela
 Bhetoipara
 Bhuer Dane
 Bhurbhure
 Bhuter Gang
 Bibir Made
 Bile
 Bogi Chenchane
 Burer Dabur
 Burigolli

C
 Chailtabari
 Chalo Bagi
 Chamta Kamta
 Chandeswar
 Chhachhon Hogla
 Chhadankhali
 Chhaprakhali
 Chhaya Halri
 Chhoto Sheola
 Chhutorkhali
 Chunkuri

D
 Dair Gang
 Dakshinchara
 Dangmari
 Deur Zande
 Dhabjikhali
 Dhakola
 Dhancher Nadi
 Dhanghara
 Dhanibune
 Dhanpati
 Dhonairgang
 Dhukuni
 Dobeki
 Domorkhali
 Dudhmukh
 Dulor Tek

E–F
 Firingi

G
 Gabandara
 Gangasagar
 Garar Nadi
 Ghat Harano
 Gochhba River
 Golbhaksa
 Golkhali
 Gonda
 Gubde

H
 Hadda
 Hansarag
 Harikhali
 Harin China
 Harmahal
 Helar Ber
 Her Matla
 Hunke

I
 Ilishmari

J
 Jalghata
 Javo
 Jhale
 Jhalki
 Jharabagna

Ka
 Kadamtali
 Kaga
 Kaikhali
 Kalagachhe
 Kalaser Bali
 Kalbeyara
 Kali Lai
 Kalida
 Kalikabari
 Kalinde River
 Kanaikhathi
 Kanchikata
 Kapa
 Karpuro
 Katheswar

Ke–Ku
 Kendakhali
 Keorasuti
 Khamurdana
 Khasitana
 Khejurdana
 Khejure Kurule
 Kukumari
 Kultali
 Kunche Mathe
 Kurekhali

L
 Lataberi
 Lathikara
 Loker Chhipi
 Luxmi Pasur

M
 Madar Bare
 Madhukhali
 Mahishe
 Majjot
 Makurni
 Malabaga
 Manasar Ber
 Mandaptala
 Mando
 Manki
 Mara Pasur
 Marichjhapi
 Mathabhanga River
 Mathura
 Mayadi
 Mukta Bangal
 Mukule
 Mulye Meghna

N
 Naobenki
 Narayantali
 Netai Talpanthi
 Netokhali
 Nilkamal

O–P
 Pala
 Panir Khal
 Parshe Mari
 Pashkati
 Patkosta
 Payra Thuni
 Phataker Dane
 Phulbari
 Phuljhuri
 Puspakati

Q–R
 Ragakhali

S
 Sapkhali
 Sathka
 Satnala
 Sejikhali
 Shakbare-Singa
 Shakbhate
 Sharankhola
 Singartali
 Sonaipanthi
 Sonarupakhali
 Sumati

T
 Talakpanthi
 Talbare
 Taltakta
 Taltali
 Tekakhali
 Terobenki
 Terokati

U
 Ubde

V–Z
 Zingili

See also
 
For links to wikipedia articles on the rivers, see: :Category: Rivers of Bangladesh and :Category: Rivers of West Bengal.

References

.
 
 
Sundarbans